Shane William Collins (born April 11, 1969) is a former defensive end in the National Football League for the Washington Redskins.  He played college football at Arizona State University and was drafted in the second round of the 1992 NFL Draft. He graduated from Bozeman High School in Bozeman. While at ASU he was the NCAA shot put national champion in 1990.

References

1969 births
Living people
American football defensive ends
Washington Redskins players
Arizona State Sun Devils football players
People from Roundup, Montana